Mohawk (film) may refer to:

Mohawk (1956 film), American historical drama directed by Kurt Neumann
Mohawk (2017 film), American horror film directed by Ted Geoghegan